In differential geometry, a branch of mathematics, a Riemannian submersion is a submersion from one Riemannian manifold to another that respects the metrics, meaning that it is an orthogonal projection on tangent spaces.

Formal definition 
Let (M, g) and (N, h) be two Riemannian manifolds and  a (surjective) submersion, i.e., a fibered manifold.

Then, f is called a Riemannian submersion if and only if the isomorphism  is an isometry.

Examples
An example of a Riemannian submersion arises when a Lie group  acts isometrically, freely and properly on a Riemannian manifold . 
The projection  to the quotient space  equipped with the quotient metric is a Riemannian submersion.

Properties
The sectional curvature of the target space of a Riemannian submersion can be calculated from the curvature of the total space by O'Neill's formula, named for Barrett O'Neill:

Generalizations and variations
Fiber bundle
Submetry
co-Lipschitz map

See also
 Fibered manifold
 Geometric topology
 Manifold

Notes

References
.
 Barrett O'Neill. The fundamental equations of a submersion. Michigan Math. J. 13 (1966), 459–469.  

Riemannian geometry
Maps of manifolds